Kirby Café is a restaurant chain in Japan, themed around Kirby, the Nintendo video game character and franchise. The first restaurant in the chain was opened in July 2016 in the special ward of Sumida City in the Solamachi entertainment complex.

History 

In Nintendo's May 2016 corporate restructuring plans, the company announced that it would expand into new businesses including restaurants. Two months later, Kirby Café was formally unveiled in Osaka and opened in August as the first in a Japan-only chain. A second location in Tokyo was planned.

On July 7, 2016, Kirby Café's Twitter account posted its first tweet which teased the upcoming opening of the café. Kirby Café was eventually opened to the public in September 2018, albeit in a temporary capacity. However, by January 22, 2021, the concept was apparently popular enough for many of the locations to become permanent. This included the location in Solamachi whose gift shop, previously located on a separate floor, was closed and was slated to move to the café proper in March 2021.

Goods 

The restaurant sold food in the theme of Kirby, a Nintendo video character and franchise. Food included drinks, pastries, noodles, and teriyaki. Some items resembled Kirby, such as the custard cakes, and others were within the series theme, such as a tomato soup dish that resembled a tomato in-game power-up and the face of the Whispy Woods tree constructed from beans, bread, and meat. Some items have little resemblance to the series apart from a sticker bearing one of the series characters.

Kirby Café also sold merchandise, including magnets, mugs, neck pillows, postcards, and tote bags containing the series characters. Some figurines could only be purchased along with food. Nintendo planned to open a merchandise-only Kirby store in Nagoya in August 2016.

Kirby Café serves food such as burgers and pizza albeit with a distinctive Kirby theme. The most expensive item, the "Whispy Woods Sweet Plate," costs ¥2,580. For its "Sweet New Year 2021" celebration the Kirby Café added a "hamburger" to its menu consisting of a slice of strawberry standing in for the tomato and a dollop of chocolate mousse for the patty. The restaurant also has temporary seasonal offerings such as a chocolate pizza, served on a board shaped like Kirby inhaling, that was added to the restaurant's winter menu on January 15, 2021 and was served until February 28.

References

Further reading 

 

Restaurants in Tokyo
2018 establishments in Japan
Kirby (series)
Restaurants established in 2018
Theme restaurants
Buildings and structures in Sumida, Tokyo